

Biography 
Born in 1943 in Beaulieu sur Mer, France. He is a painter, sculptor and furniture designer..

Louis Cane attended the National School of Decorative Arts in Nice then the Superior School of Decorative arts in Paris in 1961.

He then studied at the Superior School of Decorative Arts in Paris and got his diploma in Interior Architecture.

Cane was apart of the Supports/Surfaces Movement in France that lasted from 1969 to 1972 and co-founded and edited the Peinture, Cahiers Theoriques.

In 1978, began sculpting again. They consisted of female figures in a traditional style.

Work 
Cane focused on the concept of deconstruction of the canvas. His series, Louis Cane artiste peintre français, he continuously stamped his name on a sheet, exploring the idea of personal branding.

By 1970, Cane transitioned into a series of cut-out paintings, the toiles découpées, which he worked with for several years. His process for paintings was much like Jackson Pollock or Helen Frankenthaler, by painting the un-stretched canvas on the ground

He participated in the second and third exhibition of the Supports/Surfaces group at the Théâtre de la Cité Internationale in Paris.

In 1971, Cane had his first solo exhibition in Paris at Daniel Templon Gallery. Then at the Yvon Lambert Gallery in 1972.

From 1972 to 1972, he produced a series called Sol/Mur as apart of the Supports/Surfaces movement.

Until 1975, Cane continued his abstract series. These canvases were un-stretched, spread on the floor, spray painted and folded in half, then cut and staples directly on the wall. 

In 1978, Cane went from abstract painting to figuration. He reflected on the history of pictorial forms. He also started integrating sculpture into his practice. The statues were almost exclusively female occasionally appearing in form of burlesque or baroque expressionism. 

Cane was also a furniture designer, which is an important part of his artistic creation.

Selected Exhibitions

Solo Exhibitions 
1995

Museum of contemporary Art, Cambrai, France

1991

Musée Municipal de Bellas Artes, Santander, Spain

1971

Galerie Templon, Paris, France

Group Exhibitions 

2019

Unfurled: Supports/ Surfaces 1966-1976, curated by Wallace Whitney, MOCAD, Detroit, USA

2002

Supports/Surfaces, Galerie Dorsky, New York, USA

1991

Supports/Surfaces, Museum of modern Art, Saint-Etienne, France

1979

Museum of modern Art - A.R.C., Paris, France

Public Collections 
Centre national des arts plastiques, Paris, France

Musée national d’art moderne - centre Pompidou, Paris, France

Musée d’Art moderne et d’Art contemporain de Nice, France

Carré d’Art, Nîmes, France

Musée d’art moderne de la ville de Paris, France

Les Abattoirs, Toulouse, France

Frac Picardie, Amiens, France

Musée d’art moderne et contemporain, Saint-Etienne, France

Frac Alsace, Sélestat, France  

Frac Normandie, Caen, France

Musée de Grenoble, France

Collection Institut d’art contemporain, Rhône-Alpes, Villeurbanne, France

Musée d’art de Nantes, France

Musée d’art contemporain du Val-de-Marne, Vitry-sur-Seine, France

References 

1943 births
Living people
People from Alpes-Maritimes
French male painters
20th-century French painters
21st-century French painters
French male sculptors
21st-century French sculptors
20th-century French sculptors
French furniture designers